Richard Jones (6 June 1901 – 1962) was an English footballer who played as a wing half for Oldham Athletic,  Rochdale, Stockport County, Exeter City, and Bristol Rovers.

References

Rochdale A.F.C. players
Oldham Athletic A.F.C. players
Stockport County F.C. players
Exeter City F.C. players
Bristol Rovers F.C. players
Wigan Borough F.C. players
English footballers
Skelmersdale United F.C. players
Chorley F.C. players
Colwyn Bay F.C. players
Northwich Victoria F.C. players
Great Harwood F.C. players
Association football wingers
1901 births
1962 deaths
People from Ashton-in-Makerfield